Same-sex marriage in Ontario has been legal since June 10, 2003. The first legal same-sex marriages performed in Ontario were of Kevin Bourassa to Joe Varnell, and Elaine Vautour to Anne Vautour, by Reverend Brent Hawkes on January 14, 2001. The legality of the marriages was questioned and they were not registered until after June 10, 2003, when the Court of Appeal for Ontario in Halpern v Canada (AG) upheld a lower court ruling which declared that defining marriage in heterosexual-only terms violated the Canadian Charter of Rights and Freedoms.

Ontario became the third jurisdiction in the world (after the Netherlands and Belgium) as well as the first jurisdiction in the Americas to legalise same-sex marriage. The first legal same-sex marriage registered in Ontario was that of Paula Barrero and Blanca Mejias, married by banns at the Emmanuel Howard Park United Church on September 29, 2001 by Reverend Cheri DiNovo and registered the same year. The Office of the Registrar General apparently did not recognise the names as both being women and issued a marriage certificate. The marriage licence form requested only the names of the bride and groom, not the sex of the applicants.

All of these marriages were authorised by calling the banns in the spouses' churches. The first civil marriage licence issued to a same-sex couple was to Michael Leshner and Michael Stark, who had the usual waiting period waived and completed the formalities of marriage just hours after the court ruling, on June 10, 2003.

Background
In 1993, the Ontario Superior Court ruled in Layland v. Ontario that same-sex couples did not have the capacity to marry each other. However, that decision was non-binding as it was the same court taking up the issue in 2002. One of the judges in the most recent case wrote "with respect, the decisions to which I have referred assumed, without analysis, that the inability of persons of the same sex to marry was a question of capacity. The decisions are not binding on this court and, with respect, I do not find them persuasive."

The Equality Rights Statute Amendment Act, which would have granted same-sex couples a status comparable to civil unions, was proposed by the Provincial Government of Premier Bob Rae in 1994, but was defeated.

In October 1999, the Legislative Assembly of Ontario enacted a bill providing same-sex couples with the same statutory rights and responsibilities as opposite-sex common-law spouses under 67 provincial laws, as required by the Supreme Court of Canada's ruling in M v H. It introduced the term "same-sex partner", while maintaining the opposite-sex definition of "spouse". The law also included the right for same-sex couples to adopt children jointly.

Court of Appeal ruling

On July 12, 2002, in a 3–0 decision of the Ontario Superior Court, same-sex couples won the right to marry in the case of Halpern v Canada (AG). The court ruled that limiting marriage to opposite-sex couples violated the equality provisions of the Canadian Charter of Rights and Freedoms, giving the Government of Canada a two-year stay of judgment in which to pass legislation implementing same-sex marriage; otherwise, same-sex marriage would come into force automatically. Justice Harry LaForme wrote, "The restriction against same-sex marriage is an offence to the dignity of lesbians and gays because it limits the range of relationship options available to them. The result is they are denied the autonomy to choose whether they wish to marry. This in turn conveys the ominous message that they are unworthy of marriage....I find that there is no merit to the argument that the rights and interests of heterosexuals would be affected by granting same-sex couples the freedom to marry. I cannot conclude that freedom of religion would be threatened or jeopardized by legally sanctioning same-sex marriage." Premier Ernie Eves, a member of the Progressive Conservative Party of Ontario, said on 16 July 2002 that "Ontario won't stand in their way...If two people decide that they want to be in a union why would I interfere with that; that's my personal point of view." The Toronto City Council also passed a measure urging the government not to appeal the decision.

In 2003, the couples in Halpern appealed the decision, requesting that the decision take effect immediately instead of after a delay. On June 10, 2003, the Court of Appeal for Ontario confirmed that Canadian law on marriage violated the equality provisions in Section 15 of the Canadian Charter of Rights and Freedoms in being restricted to heterosexual couples. The Court of Appeal struck down the stay of judgment given in the 2002 ruling, thereby causing the judgment to come into effect immediately. The court wrote in its ruling:

			
Although the definition of marriage is governed by federal law, the court only had jurisdiction to implement the ruling within Ontario. The province became the first jurisdiction in North America to recognise same-sex marriage, and the third in the world after the Netherlands and Belgium. Consequently, the city of Toronto announced that the city clerk would begin issuing marriage licences to same-sex couples. The next day, the Attorney General of Ontario, Norm Sterling, announced that the province would comply with the ruling, "I'm charged to follow the laws and will follow the laws with regards to this matter." The first marriage licence issued to a same-sex couple was to Michael Leshner and Michael Stark, who had the usual waiting period waived and completed the formalities of marriage just hours after the court ruling, on June 10, 2003. The court also ruled that two couples, Kevin Bourassa and Joe Varnell, and Elaine Vautour and Anne Vautour, who had previously attempted to marry using an ancient common-law procedure called "reading the banns" would be considered legally married. Their marriages were performed in the Metropolitan Community Church of Toronto on January 14, 2001 by Reverend Brent Hawkes. Justice Minister Martin Cauchon reacted to the ruling by stating, "Listen, the marriages that are taking place now are effectively legal marriages on the basis of the decision of the appeal court rendered [on 10 June]. I say for the time being because I can't presume the future. We want to make sure that we're going to have a national solution to that question. Having said that, I'm not in a position to today to give you the official government position." Paul Martin, then running for prime minister, expressed his support for the decision. Kyle Rae, a member of the Toronto City Council, said, "It's a momentous day. It is a great day for equality in Canada." A spokesperson for Focus on the Family said, "Today's court ruling on same-sex marriage ignores centuries of precedent, and renders ordinary Canadians' views irrelevant." An opinion poll published by The Globe and Mail a few days after the decision showed that a majority of Canadians supported same-sex marriage.

Two conservative groups, who had been granted intervenor status, the Interfaith Coalition on Marriage and Family and the Association for Marriage and the Family, attempted to appeal the decision to the Supreme Court of Canada. The court heard the petition on 6 October 2003. A lawyer for the groups said, "The court is focused on hearing cases of public importance, and I don't think there has been one more important than this that has come up in the last few years. This is not the case of a stranger coming off the street. The nation is saying this [marriage] is our biggest institution. Parliament has not spoken. There is confusion. The court should speak on this issue." The federal government and the couples who initiated the lawsuit asked the court to reject the petition. The court took only three days to unanimously reject the request. A spokesman for Canadians for Equal Marriage said, "The practical effect of the Supreme Court's ruling ...is to say that same-sex marriage in Ontario and British Columbia are here to stay.", while a spokesman for the Evangelical Fellowship of Canada said they were disappointed, "We have lost an important opportunity to express the concerns of millions of Canadians."

Previously, a same-sex couple, Paula Barrero and Blanca Mejias, had been able to marry by banns at the Emmanuel Howard Park United Church in Toronto, a congregation of the United Church of Canada, on September 29, 2001. The officiant was Reverend Cheri DiNovo. The Office of the Registrar General mistook the name Paula to be that of a man and certified the marriage. The marriage caught media attention and a representative of the Office of the Registrar General sent a letter to the United Church requesting that DiNovo lose her licence. The church distanced itself from DiNovo but did not strip her of her licence.

Provincial legislation

On February 24, 2005, the Spousal Relationships Statute Law Amendment Act, 2005 was passed in the Legislative Assembly, which performed "housekeeping" on various Ontario laws, to bring their wording into line with the court ruling. As well, the bill ensures that no religious institution or clergy will be forced to perform a ceremony against their beliefs. There is no such provision for civil officials. It received royal assent by Lieutenant Governor James Bartleman on March 9, 2005. The Assembly of Catholic Bishops of Ontario supported the legislation, releasing the following statement: "Priests will have some protection, they won't find themselves in court. The Bishops wanted to be sure that religious bodies could not be compelled to allow their properties to be used for purposes associated with same-sex unions if such are contrary to their teachings, as is true for the Catholic Church. The Bill clearly provides this protection and the Ontario Bishops accordingly support it."

On November 29, 2016, the All Families Are Equal Act (Parentage and Related Registrations Statute Law Amendment), 2016 passed the Legislative Assembly by 79 votes to 0. The bill provides presumption to the spouse or conjugal partner of the birth parent, ensuring that couples who use a sperm or egg donor or a surrogate are automatically recognised as parents, and as such do not have to adopt their own children. It received royal assent by Lieutenant Governor Elizabeth Dowdeswell on December 5 and took effect on January 1, 2017.

The Marriage Act states that each of the parties to a marriage shall declare to the other:

Divorce
On September 13, 2004, the Ontario Court of Appeal declared the Divorce Act unconstitutional for excluding same-sex couples. It ordered same-sex marriages read into that act, permitting the plaintiffs, a lesbian couple, to divorce.

Two-spirit marriages
Many First Nations have traditions of two-spirit individuals who were born male but wore women's clothing and performed everyday household work and artistic handiwork which were regarded as belonging to the feminine sphere. This two-spirit status allowed for marriages between two biological males or two biological females to be performed among some of these tribes. Many agokwe were wives in polygnyous households. Among the Cree, two-spirit individuals were regarded as "esteemed persons with special spiritual powers" and were "noted shamans". The Mohawk people call two-spirit individuals , translating to "I have the pattern of two spirits inside my body."

Marriage statistics
The 2016 Canadian census showed that 26,585 same-sex couples were living in Ontario, mostly in Toronto and Ottawa. 38.2% of these couples were married.

Religious performance
The Anglican Diocese of Ottawa has allowed solemnisations of same-sex marriages since 2016. In July 2016, Bishop John Chapman issued a letter allowing local parishes to perform same-sex marriages. Clergy are not required to officiate at the marriages if this would violate their personal beliefs. Likewise, the Diocese of Niagara has allowed its clergy to perform same-sex marriages since July 2016, and the Anglican Diocese of Toronto since November 2016.

In July 2019, Bishop Linda Nicholls of the Diocese of Huron allowed her clergy to perform same-sex marriages. The move includes a freedom of conscience clause for clergy opposed to solemnising same-sex marriages. In October 2019, the synod of the Diocese of Ontario voted to request the Bishop of Ontario to authorise the solemnisation of same-sex marriages in the diocese. Bishop Michael Oulton issued guidelines the following month for clergy willing to perform same-sex marriages. Previously, a priest in Stirling-Rawdon had been disciplined for marrying a same-sex couple in 2007. Bishop Geoffrey Woodcroft of the Diocese of Rupert's Land, encompassing parts of northwestern Ontario, said in July 2019 that clergy in the diocese would be permitted to perform same-sex marriages from January 2020. Similarly, Bishop Anne Germond of the Diocese of Algoma authorised her clergy in May 2020 to perform same-sex marriages.

Same-sex marriages are not performed in the Anglican Diocese of Moosonee, which encompasses parts of northern Ontario. The marriage canon of the Anglican Church of Canada serves as the canon on marriage in the diocese. Bishop Lydia Mamakwa of the Indigenous Spiritual Ministry of Mishamikoweesh, encompassing Cree and Ojibwe communities in northwestern Ontario, opposes same-sex marriage, and the diocese does not perform same-sex marriages.

See also

Martha McCarthy
Recognition of same-sex unions in the Americas
Same-sex marriage in Canada

Notes

References

External links

LGBT in Ontario
Ontario law
Ontario
2003 in LGBT history